Cataline B. Simmons (1806 – July 13, 1883) was a businessman, politician, and religious leader in Florida.

Simmons was born in Beaufort, South Carolina in 1806. He was brought to Florida while he was enslaved and reportedly was able to ultimately purchase his freedom.

Simmons served as the first pastor of the Bethel Baptist Institutional Church in Jacksonville, Florida. He served as its pastor from 1868 to 1880.

Simmons served as a Duval County commissioner from 1868 to 1870. He and William T. Garvin then became the first African Americans to serve on the Jacksonville City Council, serving on it from 1870 to 1872. He also served as a tax assessor. At the time of his death, Simmons was noted as one of the wealthiest "colored men" in Jacksonville.

References

1806 births
1883 deaths